Puzzle Bobble Plus!, known in North America as Bust-A-Move Plus!, and in Japan as , is a video game developed by Taito for WiiWare. It was first released in Japan on April 7, 2009, and later in the PAL regions on June 26, 2009 and in North America on July 6, 2009.

There are also two additional downloadable add-ons for 200 Wii Points each.

Gameplay 
In each stage, players aim the cannon (helmed by Bubble Bobble's Bub and Bob) at the bottom of the screen, using it to shoot differently colored bubbles at a hanging arrangement of bubbles at the top of the screen in order to make them disappear within a time limit. Players must match three bubbles of the same color in order to get rid of them, with each stage being completed when all the bubbles have been cleared.

The game also features a battle mode that pits players against another opponent. Additional stages from previous games are also available as paid downloadable content.

Reception 

The game received above-average reviews according to the review aggregation website Metacritic.

References

External links 
 

2009 video games
Square Enix games
Taito games
WiiWare games
Wii-only games
Wii games
Bubble Bobble
Puzzle video games
Multiplayer and single-player video games
Video games developed in Japan